Joseph Smith, the founder and leader of the Latter Day Saint movement, and his brother, Hyrum Smith, were killed by a mob in Carthage, Illinois, United States, on June 27, 1844, while awaiting trial in the town jail.

As mayor of the city of Nauvoo, Illinois, Joseph Smith had ordered the destruction of the facilities used to print the Nauvoo Expositor, a newly established newspaper created by a group of non-Mormons and others who had seceded from the church. The newspaper's first (and only) issue was highly critical of Smith and other church leaders, reporting that Smith was practicing polygamy and claiming he intended to set himself up as a theocratic king. In response, a motion to declare the newspaper a public nuisance was passed by the Nauvoo City Council, and Smith consequently ordered its press destroyed.

The destruction of the press led to public outrage, and the Smith brothers and other members of the Nauvoo City Council were charged with inciting a riot. Warrants for Smith's arrest were dismissed by Nauvoo courts. Smith declared martial law in Nauvoo and called on the Nauvoo Legion to protect the city. After briefly fleeing Illinois, Smith returned and the brothers then voluntarily traveled to the county seat at Carthage to face the charges. After surrendering to authorities, the brothers were also charged with treason against Illinois for declaring martial law.

The brothers were in the Carthage Jail awaiting trial when an armed mob of about 200 men stormed the building, their faces painted black with wet gunpowder. Hyrum was killed almost immediately when he was shot in the face, shouting as he fell, "I am a dead man!" After emptying his pistol towards the attackers, Joseph tried to escape from a second-story window, but was shot several times and fell to the ground, where he was shot further by a makeshift firing squad.

Five men were indicted for the killings but were acquitted at a jury trial. At the time of his death, Smith was also running for president of the United States, making him the first U.S. presidential candidate to be assassinated. His death marked a turning point for the Church of Jesus Christ of Latter Day Saints, and since then, members of the Latter Day Saint movement have generally viewed him and his brother as religious martyrs who were "murdered in cold blood".

Background

Followers of the Latter Day Saint movement, or Mormons, began to move into Hancock County, Illinois, in 1839; at the time, most supported the Democratic Party. After the Mormons' expulsion from the neighboring state of Missouri during the 1838 Mormon War, Joseph Smith went to Washington, D.C., and met with President Martin Van Buren, seeking intervention and compensation for lost property. Van Buren said he could do nothing to help. Smith returned to Illinois and vowed to join the Whig Party. Most of his supporters switched with him, adding political tensions to the social suspicions in which the Mormons were held by the local populace.

Nauvoo Expositor

Several of Smith's disaffected associates in Hancock County and the city of Nauvoo, Illinois, where Smith was mayor, joined together to publish a newspaper called the Nauvoo Expositor. Its first and only issue was published June 7, 1844. Based on allegations by some of these associates, the newspaper reported that Smith practiced polygamy and that he tried to marry wives of some of his associates. The Expositor further reported that eight of Smith's wives had already been married to other men (four were Mormon men in good standing, who in a few cases acted as witnesses in Smith's marriage to his wife) at the time they married Smith. Typically, these women continued to live with their first husbands, not Smith. Some accounts say Smith may have had sexual relations with one wife, who later in her life stated that he fathered children by one or two of his wives. The reliability of these sources is disputed by some Mormons.

In response to public outrage generated by the Expositor, the Nauvoo City Council passed an ordinance declaring the newspaper a public nuisance which had been designed to promote violence against Smith and his followers. They reached this decision after some discussion, including citation of William Blackstone's legal canon, which defined a libelous press as a public nuisance. According to the Council's minutes, Smith said he "would rather die tomorrow and have the thing smashed, than live and have it go on, for it was exciting the spirit of mobocracy among the people, and bringing death and destruction upon us."

Under the Council's new ordinance, Smith, as Nauvoo's mayor, in conjunction with the City Council, ordered the city marshal to destroy the Expositor and its press on June 10, 1844. By the city marshal's account, the destruction of the press type was carried out orderly and peaceably. However, Charles A. Foster, a co-publisher of the Expositor, reported on June 12 that not only was the printing press destroyed, but that "several hundred minions ... injured the building very materially".

Smith's critics said that the action of destroying the press violated freedom of the press. Some sought legal charges against Smith for the destruction of the press, including charges of treason and inciting riot. Violent threats were made against Smith and the Mormon community. Thomas C. Sharp, editor of the Warsaw Signal in Warsaw, Illinois, a newspaper hostile to the Mormons, editorialized:

Incarceration at Carthage Jail

Warrants from outside Nauvoo were brought in against Smith and dismissed in Nauvoo courts on a writ of habeas corpus. Smith declared martial law on June 18 and called out the Nauvoo Legion, an organized city militia of about 5,000 men, to protect Nauvoo from outside violence.

In response to the crisis, Illinois Governor Thomas Ford traveled to Hancock County, and on June 21, he arrived at the county seat in Carthage. On June 22, Ford wrote to Smith and the Nauvoo City Council, proposing a trial by a non-Mormon jury in Carthage and guaranteeing Smith's safety. Smith fled the jurisdiction to avoid arrest, crossing the Mississippi River into the Iowa Territory. On June 23, a posse under the command of Governor Ford entered Nauvoo to execute an arrest warrant, but they were unable to locate Smith. After Smith was criticized by some followers, he returned and was reported to have said, "If my life is of no value to my friends it is of none to myself." Smith reluctantly submitted to arrest. He was quoted as saying, "I am going like a lamb to the slaughter; but I am calm as a summer's morning; I have a conscience void of offense towards God, and towards all men. I shall die innocent, and it shall yet be said of me—he was murdered in cold blood." On June 25, 1844, Joseph and his brother Hyrum, along with the other fifteen Council members and some friends, surrendered to Carthage constable William Bettisworth on the original charge of riot.

During the trip to Carthage, Smith reportedly recounted a dream in which he and Hyrum escaped a burning ship, walked on water, and arrived at a great heavenly city. Upon arrival at Carthage, almost immediately the Smith brothers were charged with treason against the State of Illinois for declaring martial law in Nauvoo, by a warrant founded upon the oaths of A. O. Norton and Augustine Spencer. At a preliminary hearing that afternoon, the Council members were released on $500 bonds, pending later trial. The judge ordered the Smith brothers to be held in jail until they could be tried for treason, which was a capital offense.

The Smith brothers were held at the Carthage Jail and were joined there by Willard Richards, John Taylor, and John Solomon Fullmer. Six other associates accompanied the Smiths: John P. Greene, Stephen Markham, Dan Jones, John S. Fullmer, Dr. Southwick, and Lorenzo D. Wasson.

Governor Ford left for Nauvoo not long after Smith was jailed. The anti-Mormon "Carthage Greys", a local militia, were assigned to protect the Smiths. Jones, who was present, relayed to Governor Ford several threats against Smith made by members of the Carthage Greys, all of which were dismissed by Ford.

On Thursday morning, June 27, Cyrus Wheelock went to visit Smith. He had a pass from the governor instructing the jailors to let him pass unmolested. The day was rainy, and Wheelock used the opportunity to hide a small pepper-box pistol in his bulky overcoat, which had belonged to Taylor. Most visitors were rigidly searched, but the guards forgot to check Wheelock's overcoat, and he was able to smuggle the gun to Smith. Smith took Wheelock's gun and gave Fullmer's gun to his brother Hyrum.

Attack
 
Before a trial could be held, a mob of about 200 armed men, their faces painted black with wet gunpowder, stormed the Carthage Jail in the late afternoon of June 27, 1844. As the mob was approaching, the jailer became nervous, and informed Smith of the group. In a letter dated July 10, 1844, one of the jailers wrote that Smith, expecting the Nauvoo Legion, said, "Don't trouble yourself ... they've come to rescue me." Smith did not know that Jonathan Dunham, major general of the Nauvoo Legion, had not dispatched the unit to Carthage to protect him. Allen Joseph Stout later contended that by remaining inactive, Dunham violated an official order written by Smith after he was jailed in Carthage.

The Carthage Greys reportedly feigned defense of the jail by firing shots or blanks over the attackers' heads, and some of the Greys even reportedly joined the mob, who rushed up the stairs. The mob first attempted to push the door open to fire into the room, though Smith and the other prisoners pushed back and prevented this. A member of the mob fired a shot through the door. Hyrum was shot in the face, just to the left of his nose, which threw him to the floor. He cried out, "I am a dead man!" and collapsed. He died almost immediately.

Smith, Taylor, and Richards attempted to defend themselves. Taylor and Richards used a long walking stick in order to deflect the guns as they were thrust inside the room, from behind the door. Smith used the pistol that Wheelock had given him earlier that day. Three of the six barrels misfired, but the other three shots are believed to have wounded three of the attackers.

Taylor was shot four or five times and was severely wounded, but survived. It has been popularly believed that his pocket watch stopped one shot. The watch is displayed in the LDS Church History Museum in Salt Lake City, Utah; the watch was broken and was used to help identify the time of the attack. In 2010, forensic research by J. Lynn Lyon of the University of Utah and Mormon historian Glen M. Leonard suggested that Taylor's watch was not struck by a ball, but rather broke against a window ledge. Columbia University historian Richard Bushman, the author of Joseph Smith: Rough Stone Rolling, also supports this view.

Richards, physically the largest of the Mormon captives, escaped unscathed; Lyon speculates that after the door opened, Smith was in the line of sight and Richards was not targeted. 
After using all of the shots in his pistol, Smith made his way towards the window. As Smith prepared to jump down, Richards reported that he was shot twice in the back and that a third bullet, fired from a musket on the ground outside, hit him in the chest. Taylor and Richards' accounts both report that as Smith fell from the window, he called out, "Oh Lord, my God!". Some have alleged that the context of this statement was an attempt by Smith to use a Masonic distress signal.

There are varying accounts of what happened next. Taylor and Richards' accounts state that Smith was dead when he hit the ground. Eyewitness William Daniels wrote in his 1845 account that Smith was alive when mob members propped his body against a nearby well, assembled a makeshift firing squad, and shot him before fleeing. Daniels' account also states that one man tried to decapitate Smith for a bounty, but was prevented by divine intervention. That affirmation later was denied. Additional reports said that thunder and lightning frightened off the mob. Mob members fled, shouting, "The Mormons are coming," although there was no such force nearby.

After the attack was over, Richards, who was trained as a medical doctor, went back to see if anyone besides himself had survived, and he found Taylor lying on the floor. Richards dragged Taylor into the jail cell (they had not been held in the cell, but in the guard's room across the hallway). He dragged Taylor under some of the straw mattress to put pressure on his wounds and slow the bleeding and then went to get help. Both Richards and Taylor survived. Taylor eventually became the third president of the Church of Jesus Christ of Latter-day Saints (LDS Church). Richards had escaped all harm except for a bullet grazing his ear.

Joseph's younger brother Samuel Harrison Smith had come to visit the same day and, after evading capture from a group of attackers, is said to have been the first Mormon to arrive and helped attend the bodies back to Nauvoo. He died thirty days later, possibly as a result of injuries sustained avoiding the mob.

Injuries to mob members
There have been conflicting reports about injuries to members of the mob during the attack, and whether any died. Shortly after the events occurred, Taylor wrote that he heard that two of the attackers died when Smith shot them with his pistol.

Most accounts seem to agree that at least three mob members were wounded by Smith's gunfire, but there is no other evidence that any of them died as a result. John Wills was shot in the arm, William Vorhease was shot in the shoulder, and William Gallaher was shot in the face. Others claimed that a fourth unnamed man was also wounded. Wills, Vorhease, Gallaher, and a Mr. Allen (possibly the fourth man) were all indicted for the murder of the Smith brothers. Wills, Vorhease, and Gallaher, perhaps conscious that their wounds could prove that they were involved in the mob, fled the county after being indicted and were never brought to trial. Apart from Taylor's report of what he had heard, there is no evidence that Wills, Vorhease, Gallaher, or Allen died from their wounds.

Interment

Joseph and Hyrum Smith's bodies were returned to Nauvoo the next day. The bodies were cleaned and examined, and death masks were made, preserving their facial features and structures.

A public viewing was held on June 29, 1844, after which empty coffins weighted with sandbags were used at the public burial. (This was done to prevent theft or mutilation of the bodies.) The coffins bearing the bodies of the Smith brothers were initially buried under the unfinished Nauvoo House, then disinterred and deeply reburied under an out-building on the Smith homestead.

In 1928, Frederick M. Smith, president of the Reorganized Church of Jesus Christ of Latter Day Saints (RLDS Church) and grandson of Joseph Smith, feared that rising water from the Mississippi River would destroy the grave site. He authorized civil engineer William O. Hands to conduct an excavation to find the Smiths' bodies. Hands conducted extensive digging on the Smith homestead and located the bodies, as well as finding the remains of Joseph's wife, Emma, who was buried in the same place. The remains—which were badly decomposed—were examined and photographed, and the bodies were reinterred close by in Nauvoo.

Responsibility and trial
After the killings, there was speculation about who was responsible. Governor Ford was accused of knowing about the plot to kill Smith. Ford denied this, but he later wrote that it was good for the Mormons to have been driven out of the state and said that their beliefs and actions were too different to have survived in Illinois. He said Smith was "the most successful impostor in modern times," and that some people "expect more protection from the laws than the laws are able to furnish in the face of popular excitement."

Ultimately, five defendants—Thomas C. Sharp, Mark Aldrich, William N. Grover, Jacob C. Davis and Levi Williams—were tried for the murders of the Smiths. All five defendants were acquitted by a jury, which was composed exclusively of non-Mormons after the defense counsel convinced the judge to dismiss the initial jury, which did include Mormons. The defense was led by Orville Hickman Browning, later a United States senator and cabinet member.

Consequences in the Latter Day Saint movement

After the death of the Smiths, a succession crisis occurred in the Latter Day Saint movement. Hyrum Smith, the Assistant President of the Church, was intended to succeed Joseph as President of the Church, but because he was killed with his brother, the proper succession procedure became unclear.

Initially, the primary contenders to succeed Smith were Sidney Rigdon, Brigham Young, and James Strang. Rigdon was the senior surviving member of the First Presidency, a body that had led the movement since 1832. At the time of the Smiths' deaths, he was estranged from Smith due to differences in doctrinal beliefs. Young, president of the Quorum of the Twelve, claimed authority was handed by Smith to the Quorum. Strang claimed that Smith designated him as the successor in a letter that was received a week before Smith's death. Later, others came to believe that Smith's son, Joseph Smith III, was the rightful successor under the doctrine of lineal succession.

A schism resulted, with each claimant attracting followers. The majority of Latter Day Saints followed Young; these adherents later emigrated to what became Utah Territory and continued as the LDS Church. Rigdon's followers were known as Rigdonites, some of which later established The Church of Jesus Christ (Bickertonite). Strang's followers established the Church of Jesus Christ of Latter Day Saints (Strangite). In the 1860s, those who felt that Smith should have been succeeded by Joseph Smith III established the RLDS Church, which later changed its name to the Community of Christ.

See also

 Latter Day Saint martyrs
 Oath of vengeance
 "A Poor Wayfaring Man of Grief"
 "Praise to the Man"

Notes

References

 .
 .
 
 
 Hill, Marvin S. "Carthage Conspiracy Reconsidered: A Second Look at the Murder of Joseph and Hyrum Smith", Journal of the Illinois State Historical Society, Summer 2004.
 .
 .
 
  Richards's account of Smith's death. PDF scan of original 1844 newspaper entry.
 
 
 
 . Taylor's account of Smith's death.
 
 .

Further reading

External links

 A Virtual Tour of Carthage Jail
 Doctrine and Covenants Section 135 – John Taylor's 1844 eulogy to Joseph and Hyrum Smith; now canonized by the LDS Church
 Freeman Nickeron, Death of the Prophets Joseph and Hyram  Smith, (Boston: John Gooch, 1844).
 Nauvoo Expositor: First and only issue: June 7, 1844, Published by William Law
 R. Thompson, Nauvoo Expositor
 Wm. M. Daniels, Correct Account of the Murders of Generals Joseph and Hyrum Smith, (Nauvoo: John Taylor, 1845).

Assassinations in the United States
Criminal trials that ended in acquittal
History of the Latter Day Saint movement
Lynching deaths in Illinois
Mormonism and violence
Latter Day Saint movement in Illinois
Nauvoo Legion
Deaths by firearm in Illinois
1844 in Christianity
Church of Christ (Latter Day Saints)
1844 in Illinois
June 1844 events
Murder trials
19th-century American trials
Smith, Joseph death
1844 murders in the United States